Pashuk Glacier is the steep 2.7 km long and 600 m wide glacier on the southeast side of Imeon Range, Smith Island in the South Shetland Islands, Antarctica, which is draining southeastwards from Vakarel Saddle between the side ridges descending from Antim Peak and Evlogi Peak and separating it from Krivodol Glacier to the north and Rupite Glacier to the south respectively, and flows into Osmar Strait southwest of Sredets Point.

The glacier is named after the Canadian Keri Pashuk, skipper of the sailing yacht Northanger which provided logistic support for the first ascent of the island's summit Mount Foster (2105 m) in 1996.

Location
Bulgarian mapping in 2009 and 2010.

See also
 List of glaciers in the Antarctic
 Glaciology

Maps
Chart of South Shetland including Coronation Island, &c. from the exploration of the sloop Dove in the years 1821 and 1822 by George Powell Commander of the same. Scale ca. 1:200000. London: Laurie, 1822.
  L.L. Ivanov. Antarctica: Livingston Island and Greenwich, Robert, Snow and Smith Islands. Scale 1:120000 topographic map. Troyan: Manfred Wörner Foundation, 2010.  (First edition 2009. )
 South Shetland Islands: Smith and Low Islands. Scale 1:150000 topographic map No. 13677. British Antarctic Survey, 2009.
 Antarctic Digital Database (ADD). Scale 1:250000 topographic map of Antarctica. Scientific Committee on Antarctic Research (SCAR). Since 1993, regularly upgraded and updated.
 L.L. Ivanov. Antarctica: Livingston Island and Smith Island. Scale 1:100000 topographic map. Manfred Wörner Foundation, 2017.

References
 Bulgarian Antarctic Gazetteer. Antarctic Place-names Commission. (details in Bulgarian, basic data in English)
 Pashuk Glacier. SCAR Composite Gazetteer of Antarctica

External links
 Pashuk Glacier. Copernix satellite image

Glaciers of Smith Island (South Shetland Islands)
Bulgaria and the Antarctic